Kalinjur is a locality in Vellore City in the Indian state of Tamil Nadu.It comes under the zone-2 of Vellore Municipal Corporation

Demographics
 India census, Kalinjur had a population of 16,918. Males constitute 50% of the population and females 50%. Kalinjur has an average literacy rate of 73%, higher than the national average of 59.5%: male literacy is 80%, and female literacy is 67%. In Kalinjur, 11% of the population is under 6 years of age.

References

Cities and towns in Vellore district